Eucalyptus cyanophylla, commonly known as the Murraylands mallee, blue-leaved mallee or ghost mallee, is a species of mallee that is endemic to southern Australia. It has mostly smooth bark, greyish blue, lance-shaped or curved adult leaves, flower buds in groups of seven, white flowers and conical, cup-shaped or barrel-shaped fruit.

Description
It has pinkish brown or white to orange bark, often with rough, fibrous grey or reddish bark on the lower trunk. Flowering occurs between August and October and the flowers are white.

Taxonomy and naming
Eucalyptus cyanophylla was first formally described in 1977 by Ian Brooker from a specimen collected near Berri by Bruce Copley. The description was published in Transactions of the Royal Society of South Australia. The specific epithet (cyanophylla) is derived from the Ancient Greek words kyanos meaning "dark blue" and phyllon meaning "leaf" referring to the colour of the leaves.

Distribution and habitat
Blue-leaved mallee grows in sandy soil, usually over limestone, in open shrubland. It is mainly found between Waikerie, Renmark and Alawoona in South Australia and in northwestern Victoria.

See also
List of Eucalyptus species

References

Trees of Australia
cyanophylla
Myrtales of Australia
Flora of South Australia
Taxa named by Ian Brooker